Roger Beyker Martínez Tobinson (born 23 June 1994) is a Colombian professional footballer who plays as a winger or forward for Liga MX club América and the Colombia national team.

Club career

Early career
He began playing on November 11, Juventus and Expreso Rojo, a team with which he became champion. He was also called to the selection of his Cartagena province. Later he had a brief stint at Academia de Crespo and from there he went to a training school in Medellín called Student. At the age of 17, he was offered to go to Argentina, arriving at Boca Juniors where he was tested for a few months; although they loved him, he could not play official matches because he was not with his parents. He returned to Colombia to later return to Argentina, this time to Argentinos Juniors where he spent 6 months and suffered the same fate as in Boca. Then his representative would get him a chance at Racing.

Racing Club
He made his debut for Racing Club de Argentina in a match for the 2013 Copa Sudamericana, in which his team fell to Lanús 2–1, entering the second half replacing Ricardo Centurión. His first match in the First Division of Argentine soccer was in the defeat of his team by 3 to 1 against Tigre for the 2013 Initial Tournament.

Loan to Santamarina
In 2014, the Racing coach, Diego Cocca, confirmed that he would not take him into account and they transferred him to Santamarina from the second division of Argentine football without a purchase option. His first game was against Atlético Tucumán where he assisted his teammate Martín Michel at the last minute to make it 1–0. In only 2 games was he a starter, the other 7 always coming off the bench. His loan ended and he returned to Racing.

Loan to Aldosivi
In 2015 the Racing coach, Diego Cocca, confirmed (for the 2nd time) that he would not take him into account and they transferred him to Aldosivi, recently promoted to the First Division of Argentina. His first match was on the 1st date, against Vélez Sarsfield, in a 2–0 defeat. His first goal was scored against Sarmiento de Junin, in a 2–2 draw. His second goal was against Quilmes after an excellent combination between Jose Sand and Pablo Luguercio (2 ex Racing) where he defined a dive against Fabian Assman. His third goal was against Unión, in a 3–3 draw. His fourth goal was against Godoy Cruz de Mendoza, in a 2–0 victory. His fifth goal in Aldosivi was against Boca Juniors at La Bombonera, in a historic victory 3 to 0, where he takes away his unbeaten record in the championship. His sixth and last goal for the Mar del Plata club was a header against Estudiantes de La Plata, in a 2–1 defeat, where he also scored a goal from his own net.

Return
After having played 27 games, converting 6 goals and having good performances in Aldosivi "El Tiburón", Facundo Sava informed him that he would take him into account for the next season and he returns for the third time to Racing Club de Avellaneda. On February 24, 2016, he scored his first international goal with Racing against Bolívar in the 4–1 victory for the first date of the 2016 Copa Libertadores.

Jiangsu Suning
On July 12, 2016, he moved to Jiangsu Suning from China in exchange for 9,800,000 euros, with the possibility, in the future, of reaching Inter Milan. his team 4–0 over Hebei CFFC. He would score a double again on July 30 in a 3–2 loss at the hands of Shanghai Shenhua.​ He would double again on August 21, giving his team a 2–1 victory over the Beijing Guoan. On October 22, he scored a brace where he would tie at two goals against Chongqing Lifan. On November 27, he scored a brace in the final of the China Cup in a two-goal draw against Guangzhou Evergrande, where they would lose by a visitor goal as runners-up in the tournament. On May 24, he scored his first goal of 2017 for the AFC Champions League in a 2–1 loss at his visit to Shanghai SIPG. His first brace of the year comes on August 9 in a 4–2 away loss against Guangzhou R&F.

Loan to Villareal
On January 7, 2018, his arrival on loan for six months with a purchase option is confirmed at Villarreal Club de Fútbol of the Spanish League where he will be a teammate of his compatriot Carlos Bacca.  He debuts on January 10 playing the last 18 minutes in the 2–1 victory over CD Leganés although they were eliminated on aggregate by the round of 16 of the Copa del Rey. Converting his first goal in Spain, on the last date of the League, scoring the partial discount of the final 2–2, against Real Madrid.

Club América
In June 2018, he was confirmed as a new player for Club América in the First Division of Mexico for 8,500,000 euros. He debuted on July 22 scoring the goal for his team in a 2–1 loss at Club Necaxa. His first goal of 2019 was on February 2 from a penalty kick in a 2–0 victory over Querétaro FC. He scored a brace on February 5 in a 3–1 win over Club Necaxa, coming out as the star of the match for the Mexico Cup, he came back and scored a brace for the Cup on February 26 in a 5–2 win over CF Pachuca. On May 9, for the first leg quarterfinals, he scored a double in a 3–1 victory over Cruz Azul. His first goal of the season marks July 21 in a 4–2 victory over CF Monterrey. On October 29, he scored the winning goal by the minimum as visitors against Atlético San Luis.

International career

Youth 
He was called up to the Colombia under-23 team. Roger played in the international playoff against the United States, in order to return to an Olympic event. The first leg was on March 25, 2016 in Barranquilla, ended 1–1 and had no minutes. On March 29, in the second leg, Colombia defeated the United States 1–2 in Houston, Roger scored both goals and was the figure, giving Colombia the classification to the 2016 Olympic Games. However, coach Carlos 'Piscis' Restrepo did not take him into account for the 2016 Rio Olympics tournament.

Senior 
Martínez was included in coach José Pekerman's squad for the Copa América Centenario. He made his debut with Colombia on 29 May 2016 in a friendly match against Haiti, scoring Colombia's third goal in their 3–1 win.

On 30 May 2019, he would be selected in the final list of 23 players who played the 2019 Copa América in Brazil. On June 9, he would attend for the final 3–0 win over Peru in a friendly match played in Lima. On June 15, he scored the first in the 2–0 victory over Argentina for the first date of the Copa América 2019. On September 2, 2021, he scored in Colombia's 1–1 draw with Bolivia for the Qualifiers against Qatar 2022.

International goals

Honours
América
Liga MX: Apertura 2018
Copa MX: Clausura 2019
Campeón de Campeones: 2019

Individual
Chinese FA Cup Most Valuable Player: 2016

References

External links
 
 
 

1994 births
Living people
Sportspeople from Cartagena, Colombia
Association football forwards
Colombian footballers
Colombia international footballers
Racing Club de Avellaneda footballers
Club y Biblioteca Ramón Santamarina footballers
Aldosivi footballers
Jiangsu F.C. players
Villarreal CF players
Club América footballers
Argentine Primera División players
Primera Nacional players
Chinese Super League players
La Liga players
Liga MX players
Colombian expatriate footballers
Expatriate footballers in Argentina
Expatriate footballers in China
Expatriate footballers in Mexico
Colombian expatriate sportspeople in Argentina
Colombian expatriate sportspeople in China
Colombian expatriate sportspeople in Mexico
Copa América Centenario players
2019 Copa América players
Colombian people of African descent